Ficus uncinata, also known as earth fig in English and as ara entimau in Iban, is a species of flowering plant, a fruit tree in the fig family, that is native to Southeast Asia.

Description
The species grows as a shrub or small tree to 8 m in height, with a bole of up to 2 m, from which stolons extend along the ground surface for up to 10 m. The hairy, greenish-brown leaves are 21–27 cm long by 10–11 cm wide. The inflorescences occur along the stolons. The pink, red or brownish-purple fruits are 2–4 cm in diameter, and are covered by spine-like bracts.
 
The ground-level figs are eaten and the seeds dispersed by pigs, deer, ground squirrels and rats. The function of the bracts is to prevent the fruits being swallowed whole by ground-level seed predators, such as pheasants and partridges.

Distribution and habitat
The species is found in Borneo and possibly in Sumatra. It occurs along streams and in hill areas and mountain forest up to an elevation of 2,000 m.

References

 
uncinata
Flora of Borneo
Fruits originating in Asia
Plants described in 1888
Taxa named by George King (botanist)